Plagiognathus atricornis is a species of plant bug in the family Miridae.

References

Further reading

 

Plagiognathus
Articles created by Qbugbot
Insects described in 1926